Scott Johnson may refer to:

Music
Scott Johnson (composer) (born 1952), American composer
Scott Johnson, guitarist for Gin Blossoms
Scott Johnson, drum technician killed in the 2012 Radiohead stage collapse

Sports
Scott Johnson (rugby union) (born 1962), Australian rugby union coach
Scott Johnson (American football), college football coach at Southern Oregon University 1972–1979
Scott Johnson (gymnast), American artistic gymnast

Other uses
Scott Johnson (actor), Australian actor
Scott Johnson (architect) (born 1951), American architect
Scott Johnson (cartoonist) (born 1969), cartoonist, illustrator, and creator of the Extralife comics, radio show and blog
Scott C. Johnson, American journalist and author
Scott Johnson (murder victim) (19611988), American PhD student in mathematics and victim of a 1988 suspected homophobic murder in Australia
Scott Johnson (Wisconsin politician) (born 1954), Wisconsin politician
Scott W. Johnson (born 1951), American lawyer and founder of the Power Line political blog
L. Scott Johnson, guest of honor at Ropecon 2009
M. Scott Johnson, sculptor of contemporary African American art